Crocota tinctaria is a moth of the family Geometridae first described by Jacob Hübner in 1799. It is found in France, Italy, Switzerland and Austria.

The wingspan is 29–35 mm. Adults are on wing in June, July and August.

The larvae feed on Polygonum bistorta, Gentiana, Leontodon, Rumex, Plantago, and Taraxacum species.

References
Nyst R. H.: Additional data on the geographical distribution of the genus Crocota (Lepidoptera, Geometridae). Phegea 28(3) 123
Leraut, P. 1999. Contribution à l'étude des espèces du genre Crocota Hübner (Lepidoptera, Geometridae). Alexanor 20(8)(1998) 467–481

External links

Moths and Butterflies of Europe and North Africa
Fauna Europaea
Lepiforum e.V.

Moths described in 1799
Boarmiini
Moths of Europe
Taxa named by Jacob Hübner